is a railway station on the Takayama Main Line in the city of Gero,  Gifu Prefecture, Japan, operated by Central Japan Railway Company (JR Central).

Lines

Station layout
Hida-Miyada Station has one ground-level side platform serving a single bi-directional track. The station is unattended.

Adjacent stations

History
Hida-Miyada Station opened on October 1, 1955. The station was absorbed into the JR Central network upon the privatization of Japanese National Railways (JNR) on April 1, 1987.

Surrounding area
 
Miyada Elementary School

See also

 List of Railway Stations in Japan

Railway stations in Gifu Prefecture
Takayama Main Line
Railway stations in Japan opened in 1955
Stations of Central Japan Railway Company
Gero, Gifu